From October 23, 2010 to March 20, 2011, the following skiing events took place at various locations around the world.

Alpine skiing
 October 23, 2010 – March 20, 2011 –2011 Alpine Skiing World Cup
Men Overall Title: Ivica Kostelić of Croatia
Women Overall Title: Maria Riesch of Germany
 January 14 – January 23 – 2011 IPC Alpine Skiing World Championships in Sestriere
 February 7 – February 20 – FIS Alpine World Ski Championships 2011 in Garmisch-Partenkirchen

Nordic skiing
 February 22 – March 6 – FIS Nordic World Ski Championships 2011 in Oslo
 March 29 – April 11 – 2011 IPC Biathlon and Cross-Country Skiing World Championships in Khanty-Mansiysk

Ski mountaineering
2011 World Championship of Ski Mountaineering, held in Claut, Italy

External links

 International Ski Federation official website
 IPC Alpine Skiing official website
 International Biathlon Union official website
 IPC Biathlon and Cross Country Skiing official website

Skiing by year
Skiing
Skiing